Richard Colley Wellesley, 1st Marquess Wellesley,  (20 June 1760 – 26 September 1842) was an Anglo-Irish politician and colonial administrator. He was styled as Viscount Wellesley until 1781, when he succeeded his father as 2nd Earl of Mornington. In 1799, he was granted the Irish peerage title of Marquess Wellesley. He was also Lord Wellesley in the Peerage of Great Britain.

He first made his name as fifth Governor-General of India between 1798 and 1805. He later served as Foreign Secretary in the British Cabinet and as Lord Lieutenant of Ireland. In 1799, his forces invaded Mysore and defeated Tipu, the Sultan of Mysore, in a major battle. He also initiated the Second Anglo-Maratha War.

He was the eldest son of The 1st Earl of Mornington, an Irish peer, and Anne, the eldest daughter of The 1st Viscount Dungannon. His younger brother, Arthur, was Field Marshal The 1st Duke of Wellington.

Education and early career
Wellesley was born in 1760 in Dangan Castle in County Meath, Ireland, where his family was part of the Ascendancy, the old Anglo-Irish aristocracy. He was educated at the Royal School, Armagh, Harrow School and Eton College, where he distinguished himself as a classical scholar, and at Christ Church, Oxford. He is one of the few men known to have attended both Harrow and Eton.

In 1780, he entered the Irish House of Commons as the member for Trim until the following year when, at his father's death, he became 2nd Earl of Mornington, taking his seat in the Irish House of Lords. He was elected Grand Master of the Grand Lodge of Ireland in 1782, a post he held for the following year. Due to the extravagance of his father and grandfather, he found himself so indebted that he was ultimately forced to sell all the Irish estates. However, in 1781, he was appointed to the coveted position of Custos Rotulorum of Meath.

In 1784, he joined also the British House of Commons as member for the rotten borough of Bere Alston in Devon. Soon afterwards he was appointed a Lord of the Treasury by William Pitt the Younger.

The 1792 Slave Trade Bill passed the House of Commons mangled and mutilated by the modifications and amendments of Pitt, Earl of Mornington, Edward James Eliot and the Attorney General, it lay for years, in the House of Lords.

In 1793, he became a member of the Board of Control over Indian affairs; and, although he was best known for his speeches in defence of Pitt's foreign policy, he was gaining the acquaintance with Oriental affairs which made his rule over India so effective from the moment when, in 1797, he accepted the office of Governor-General of India.

Work in India

Mornington seems to have caught Pitt's large political spirit in the period 1798 to 1805. That both had consciously formed the design of expanding their influence in the Indian subcontinent to compensate for the loss of the American colonies is not proven; but the rivalry with France, which in Europe placed Britain at the head of coalition after coalition against the French, made Mornington aware of the necessity of ensuring French power did not reign supreme in India. 

On the voyage out, he formed the design of curbing French influence in the Deccan. Soon after his arrival, in April 1798, he learned that an alliance was being negotiated between Tipu Sultan and France. Mornington resolved to anticipate the action of the Sultan and ordered preparations for war. The first step was to order the disbandment of the French troops entertained by the Nizam of Hyderabad.

The capture of Mysore followed in February 1799, and the campaign was brought to a swift conclusion by the capture of Seringapatam on 4 May 1799 and the death of Tipu Sultan, who was killed in action. In 1803, the restoration of the Peshwa proved the prelude to the war against Sindhia and the raja of Berar, in which his brother Arthur took a leading role. 

The result of these wars and of the treaties which followed them was that French influence in India was reduced to Pondicherry, and that Britain acquired increased influence in the heartlands of central India. He proved to be a skilled administrator, and picked two of his talented brothers for his staff: Arthur was his military adviser, and Henry was his personal secretary. He founded Fort William College, a training centre intended for those who would be involved in governing India. In connection with this college, he established the governor-general's office, to which civilians who had shown talent at the college were transferred, in order that they might learn something of the highest statesmanship in the immediate service of their chief. He endeavoured to remove some of the restrictions on the trade between Europe and Asia. He took the time to publish an appreciation of British composer Harriet Wainwright's opera Comala in the Calcutta Post on 27 April 1804.

Both the commercial policy of Wellesley and his educational projects brought him into hostility with the court of directors, and he more than once tendered his resignation, which, however, public necessities led him to postpone till the autumn of 1805. He reached England just in time to see Pitt before his death. 

He had been created a Peer of Great Britain in 1797 as Baron Wellesley, and in 1799 became Marquess Wellesley in the Peerage of Ireland. He formed an enormous collection of over 2,500 painted miniatures in the Company style of Indian natural history. A motion by James Paull (MP) to impeach Wellesley due to his expulsion of British traders from Oudh was defeated in the House of Commons by 182 votes to 31 in 1808. Mornington also disapproved of liaisons between Company officials and soldiers and locals, seeing them as improper.

Napoleonic Wars

On the fall of the coalition ministry in 1807, Wellesley was invited by George III to join the Duke of Portland's cabinet, but he declined, pending the discussion in parliament of certain charges brought against him in respect of his Indian administration. Resolutions condemning him for the abuse of power were moved in both the Lords and Commons but defeated by large majorities.

In 1809, Wellesley was appointed ambassador to Spain. He landed at Cádiz just after the Battle of Talavera, and tried unsuccessfully to bring the Spanish government into effective co-operation with his brother, who, through the failure of his allies, had been forced to retreat into Portugal. A few months later, after the duel between George Canning and Robert Stewart, Viscount Castlereagh, and the resignation of both, Wellesley accepted the post of Foreign Secretary in Spencer Perceval's cabinet. Unlike his brother Arthur, he was an eloquent speaker, but was subject to inexplicable "black-outs" when he was apparently unaware of his surroundings. He held this office until February 1812, when he retired, partly from dissatisfaction at the inadequate support given to Wellington by the ministry, but also because he had become convinced that the question of Catholic emancipation could no longer be kept in the background. From early life, Wellesley had, like his brother Arthur, been an advocate of Catholic emancipation, and with the claim of the Irish Catholics to justice, he henceforward identified himself. 

Twice Viceroy of Ireland, and one of the original Knights of St Patrick, he surrendered that order on being made a Knight of the Garter on 31 March 1812.

Upon Perceval's assassination he, along with Canning, refused to join Lord Liverpool's administration, and he remained out of office until 1821, criticising with severity the proceedings of the Congress of Vienna and the European settlement of 1814, which, while it reduced France to its ancient limits, left to the other great powers the territory that they had acquired by the Partitions of Poland and the destruction of the Republic of Venice. 

He was one of the peers who signed the protest against the enactment of the Corn Laws in 1815. His reputation never fully recovered from a fiasco in 1812 when he was expected to make a crucial speech denouncing the new Government, but suffered one of his notorious "black-outs" and sat motionless in his place.

Family life

Wellesley lived together for many years with Hyacinthe-Gabrielle Roland, an actress at the Palais Royal. She had three sons and two daughters with Wellesley before he married her on 29 November 1794. He moved her to London, where Hyacinthe was generally miserable, as she never learned English and she was scorned by high society: Lady Caroline Lamb was warned by her mother-in-law, Elizabeth Milbanke, a noted judge of what was socially acceptable,  that no respectable woman could afford to be seen in Hyacinthe's company.

Their children were:
 Richard Wellesley (1787–1831), a member of parliament
 Anne Wellesley (1788–1875), who married firstly Sir William Abdy, 7th Baronet, and secondly Lieutenant-Colonel Lord Charles Bentinck (ancestor of Queen Elizabeth II)
 Hyacinthe Mary Wellesley (1789–1849), who married Edward Littleton, 1st Baron Hatherton
 Gerald Wellesley (1792–1833), who served as the East India Company's resident at Indore.
 The Rev. Henry Wellesley (1794–1866), Principal of New Inn Hall, Oxford.

Through his eldest daughter Lady Charles Bentinck, Wellesley was a great-great-great-grandfather to Queen Elizabeth II.

Wellesley also had at least two other illegitimate sons by his teenage mistress, Elizabeth Johnston, including Edward (later his father's secretary), born in Middlesex (1796-1877).  Wellesley's children were seen by Richard's other relatives, including his brother Arthur, as greedy, unattractive and cunning, and as exercising an unhealthy influence over their father; in the family circle they were nicknamed "The Parasites".

Following his first wife's death in 1816, he married, on 29 October 1825, the widowed Marianne (Caton) Patterson (died 1853), whose mother Mary was the daughter of Charles Carroll of Carrollton, the last surviving signatory of the United States Declaration of Independence; her former sister-in-law was Elizabeth Patterson Bonaparte. Wellington, who was very fond of Marianne (rumour had it that they were lovers)  and was then on rather bad terms with his brother, pleaded with her not to marry him, warning her in particular that  "The Parasites", (Richard's children by Hyacinthe)  would see her as an enemy. The Duke's concern seems to have been misplaced; they had no children, but the marriage was a relatively happy one - "much of the calm and sunshine of his old age can be attributed to Marianne".

Ireland and later life

In 1821, he was appointed Lord Lieutenant of Ireland. Catholic emancipation had now become an open question in the cabinet, and Wellesley's acceptance of the viceroyalty was believed in Ireland to herald the immediate settlement of the Catholic claims but they would remain unfulfilled. Some efforts were made to placate Catholic opinion, notably the dismissal of the long-serving Attorney-General for Ireland, William Saurin, whose anti-Catholic views had made him bitterly unpopular. Lord Liverpool died without having grappled with the problem. His successor, Canning, died only a few months after taking up office as Prime Minister, to be succeeded briefly by Lord Goderich.

On the assumption of office by Wellington, his brother resigned the lord-lieutenancy. He is said to have been deeply hurt by his brother's failure to find a Cabinet position for him (Arthur made the usual excuse that one cannot give a Cabinet seat to everyone who wants one). 

He had, however, the satisfaction of seeing the Catholic claims settled in the next year by the very statesmen who had declared against them. In 1833, he resumed the office of Lord Lieutenant under Earl Grey, but the ministry soon fell, and, with one short exception, Wellesley did not take any further part in official life.

Death

On his death, he had no successor in the marquessate, but the earldom of Mornington and minor honours devolved on his brother William, Lord Maryborough, on the failure of whose issue in 1863 they fell to the 2nd Duke of Wellington.

He and Arthur, after a long estrangement, had been once more on friendly terms for some years: Arthur wept at the funeral and said that he knew of no honour greater than being Lord Wellesley's brother.

Wellesley was buried in Eton College Chapel, at his old school.

Legacy

The Township of Wellesley, in Ontario, Canada, was named in Richard Wellesley's honour, despite the many references (e.g.: Waterloo, Wellington County) to his brother, Arthur Wellesley in the surrounding area, as was Wellesley Island, located in the St. Lawrence river at Alexandria Bay. Wellesley Island also serves as the last point exiting the United States before crossing to Hill Island, in Canada.

Province Wellesley, in the state of Penang, Malaysia, was named after Richard Wellesley. It was originally part of the state of Kedah. It was ceded to the British East India Company by the Sultan of Kedah in 1798, and has been part of the settlement and state of Penang ever since. It was renamed Seberang Perai ("across the Perai" in the Malay language) not long after independence within Malaya.

The Wellesley Islands off the north coast of Queensland, Australia, were named by Matthew Flinders in honour of Richard Wellesley, as was the largest island in the group, Mornington Island. Flinders is believed to have done this during his imprisonment by the French on Mauritius Island as Wellesley had tried to secure his release.

Mornington Peninsula, south of Melbourne, was named after him.

As of the summer of 2007, a portrait of Marquess Wellesley hangs in the Throne Room at Buckingham Palace.
A street in Mirzapur (United Provinces) was named Wellesleyganj

Ancestry

Arms

Notes

References

Bibliography

 Butler, Iris. The Eldest Brother: the Marquess Wellesley 1760-1842. London: Hodder and Stoughton, 1973.
 
 Ingram, Edward, ed. Two Views of British India: The Private Correspondence of Mr. Dundas and Lord Wellesley, 1798–1801. Bath: Adams and Dart, 1970.
 
 Martin, Robert Montgomery, ed. The Despatches, Minutes & Correspondence of the Marquess Wellesley During His Administration in India. 5 vols. London: 1836–37.
 Pearce, Robert Rouiere. Memoirs and Correspondence of the Most Noble Richard Marquess Wellesley. 3 vols. London: 1846.
 Renick, M. S. Lord Wellesley and the Indian States. Agra: Arvind Vivek Prakashan, 1987.
 Roberts, P. E. India Under Wellesley. London: George Bell & Sons, 1929.
 
 Torrens, William McCullagh. The Marquess Wellesley: Architect of Empire. London: Chatto and Windus, 1880.

Further reading

External links
 HolisticThought.com is for sale

1760 births
1842 deaths
19th-century Irish politicians
People educated at The Royal School, Armagh
People educated at Harrow School
Alumni of Christ Church, Oxford
Members of the Parliament of Ireland (pre-1801) for County Meath constituencies
Irish MPs 1776–1783
Members of the Parliament of Great Britain for English constituencies
British MPs 1784–1790
British MPs 1790–1796
British MPs 1796–1800
British Secretaries of State
British Secretaries of State for Foreign Affairs
Diplomatic peers
Founders of Indian schools and colleges
Governors-General of India
Richard Wellesley, 1st Marquess Wellesley
Knights of St Patrick
Knights of the Garter
Lords Lieutenant of Ireland
Marquesses in the Peerage of Ireland
Peers of Great Britain created by George III
Members of the Privy Council of Great Britain
Members of the Privy Council of Ireland
Tory MPs (pre-1834)
Ambassadors of the United Kingdom of Great Britain and Ireland to Spain
Irish expatriates in India
Irish expatriates in Spain
Irish expatriates in England
Earls of Mornington
Members of the Parliament of Great Britain for Bere Alston
Members of the Parliament of Great Britain for Saltash
People educated at Eton College